Hoya serpens is a small trailing vine found in the Himalayas and surrounding areas.  It has small round leaves that are 1.5 to 2 cm long.  The leaves are dark green, hairy, and have grey spots intermittently dispersed.

The flowers produced are extremely fuzzy with a light green corolla and a white corona with a bit of pink towards the center of the flower, with finally a yellow center.  The flowers last about a week, and unlike other Hoyas, produce very little nectar.  Additionally, the flowers produce a sweet fragrance.  It was first discovered and published by Joseph Dalton Hooker in 1883.

References

FLORA OF BRITISH INDIA Vol. 4 p. 55, J. D. Hooker, (1883)

serpens
Taxa named by Joseph Dalton Hooker